The 2015 Games of the Small States of Europe, also known as the XVI Games of the Small States of Europe, were held in Iceland. The slogan was "Natural Power". Icelandic singer Paul Oscar sang during the opening ceremony.

Host nation Iceland won the most medals at the Games, which included ten sports.

Games

Participating teams

  (52)
  (56)
  (host team) (240)
  (42)
  (136)
  (58)
  (105)
  (42)
  (58)

Sports

 
 
 
 
 
 
 Trap shooting (1)
 
 
 
 
  Beach volleyball (2)

Venues

Calendar

Medal table

Key:

References

External links
2015 GSSE Official Website

 
Games of the Small States of Europe
Games of the Small States of Europe
Games of the Small States of Europe
International sports competitions hosted by Iceland
Multi-sport events in Iceland
Games of the Small States of Europe
Games of the Small States of Europe
2010s in Reykjavík
Sports competitions in Reykjavík